Rukmale is a village situated in the Maharagama Electorate, Colombo District, in the Western Province, Sri Lanka. It is administered by the Maharagama Urban Council.

Surrounding towns include Kottawa, Malapalla, Horahena, Hokandara, Aturugiriya, Walgama, Pinketha, Homagama, Galawila and Makumbura.

There are number of bus routes passing the area starting from Colombo, Maharagama, Kottawa, Aturuguruya, Malabe and Homagama.
 Colombo-Aturugiriya, route no.123
 Colombo-Rukmalgama, route no. 138
 Maharagama-Aturugiriya, route no.123
 Kottawa-Malabe route no.376
 Homagama-Maharagama route no.128.
The proposed development project of Southern Expressway runs through Rukmale village.

B. D. Rampala (Bamunusinghearachchige Don Rampala), mechanical engineer and General Manager of Sri Lanka Railways, was born in Rukmale.

Populated places in Colombo District